Eliso is a 1928 Soviet silent adventure film directed by Nikoloz Shengelaia and loosely based on the short story by Alexander Kazbegi. It was made in the Georgian Soviet Socialist Republic.

It was released in the United States in 1929 by Amkino under the alternative title of Caucasian Love.

Plot
The film is set in the 19th century. To consolidate its power in the Caucasus region, the Russian government intends to evict the Chechens from the Russian empire. A cossack Ataman fraudulently obtains signatures from illiterate residents for a petition which calls for resettlement to Turkey, by disguising it as a request for permission to stay on their land to the governor-general of Muslims of the Verdi mountain aul. The daughter of the village elders, Eliso falls in love with Khevsurian Vajia, who is a Christian. He is seeking the abolition of the decree to expel Chechens, but his heroic efforts to save the village are futile. Residents have already been banished from their homes and leave the village. Vajia as a kafir has no right to leave with them out of their homes. Eliso can not accept the fate of an outlaw, she sneaks at night into the village, which is already inhabited by the Cossacks, and sets fire to it.

Cast
 Aleksandre Imedashvili as Astamur  
 Kokhta Karalashvili as Vajia  
 Kira Andronikashvili as Eliso  
 I. Mamporya as Seidulla  
 Tsetsilia Tsutsunava as Zazubika  
 Aleksandre Jorjoliani as General  
 K. Gurianov as Billeting officer  
 I. Galkin as Village constable  
 Marika Chimishkian as Muslimati

Reception
Sergei Eisenstein expressed to Ivor Montagu that there were only two good portrayals of the lezginka in film, and that Shengelaya's in Eliso was better than in October: Ten Days That Shook the World, the film he directed.

References

Bibliography 
 Christie, Ian & Taylor, Richard. The Film Factory: Russian and Soviet Cinema in Documents 1896-1939. Routledge, 2012.

External links 
 

1928 films
Soviet silent feature films
Soviet adventure drama films
Georgian-language films
Silent films from Georgia (country)
Soviet black-and-white films
1920s adventure drama films
1928 drama films
Black-and-white films from Georgia (country)
Adventure drama films from Georgia (country)
Silent adventure drama films
Soviet-era films from Georgia (country)